Lucrezia is an opera in one act and three tableaux by Ottorino Respighi to a libretto by Claudio Guastalla, after Livy and William Shakespeare's The Rape of Lucrece, itself based heavily on Ovid's Fasti. Respighi died before finishing the work, which was therefore completed by his wife, Elsa Respighi, and by one of his pupils, Ennio Porrino. The première had a good reception.

Lucrezia was much appreciated by the famous Italian musicologist Andrea Della Corte, who considered this opera as one of the best stage works of Respighi, thanks to the accomplished balance of expressivity and musical skill.  One of the distinctive features of Lucrezia is the presence of the Voice, a character that sings from within the orchestra and describes what is happening on the stage and the emotions of the other characters.

Roles

Instrumentation
Lucrezia is scored for the following instruments:

piccolo, 2 flutes , 2 oboes, English horn, 2 clarinets in B flat, 2 bassoons, 4 horns in F, 3 trumpets in B flat, 2 tenor trombones, bass trombone, tuba, cymbals, bass drum, tam-tam, strings.

Synopsis
Time: 509 BC.
Place: Rome
Sesto Tarquinio (son of Tarquin the Proud, the last king of Rome), Bruto and Collatino are in the tent of Tarquinio and discuss about the faithfulness of their wives; Bruto seems the most sceptical. Later they decide to return to Rome and verify directly the uprightness of their women.

Lucrezia, the wife of Collatino, tells her women a story that highlights the importance of living with honour and honesty. But during the night Tarquinio, who has become infatuated with Lucrezia, gets into the house of Collatino and rapes her.

The following day Lucrezia, overwhelmed with shame, asks Collatino to be revenged, then takes her own life. Bruto becomes one of the leaders of the rebellion against Tarquinio and his father, that leads to the overthrow of the monarchy.

Recordings

References

Further reading

External links

Operas
Italian-language operas
1937 operas
Operas by Ottorino Respighi
Operas based on works by William Shakespeare
Operas set in ancient Rome
Cultural depictions of Sextus Tarquinius
Cultural depictions of Lucretia
Works based on Fasti (poem)
Operas based on works by Ovid